Pablo Cristián Squella Serrano (born August 14, 1963) is a Chilean journalist and retired middle distance runner, who represented his native country at the 1988 Summer Olympics in Seoul, South Korea.  He finished fifth in the 800 metres and in the 400 metres hurdles at the 1987 Pan American Games. He was appointed as minister of Sport of Chile by president Michelle Bachelet in 2016 and served in that position until 11 March 2018. He is the ambassador of the 2023 Pan American Games and the Parapan American Games in Santiago.

International competitions

1Did not finish in the semifinals

References
 
 1983 Year Ranking
 sports-reference

1963 births
Living people
Chilean sportsperson-politicians
Chilean journalists
Chilean Ministers of Sport
Chilean male hurdlers
Chilean male sprinters
Chilean male middle-distance runners
Olympic male middle-distance runners
Olympic athletes of Chile
Athletes (track and field) at the 1988 Summer Olympics
Athletes (track and field) at the 1987 Pan American Games
Athletes (track and field) at the 1991 Pan American Games
Pan American Games competitors for Chile
South American Games gold medalists for Chile
South American Games silver medalists for Chile
South American Games medalists in athletics
Competitors at the 1982 Southern Cross Games
Competitors at the 1986 South American Games
Competitors at the 1994 South American Games
World Athletics Championships athletes for Chile
Japan Championships in Athletics winners
20th-century Chilean people